Rąbity  (German Rombitten) is a village in the administrative district of Gmina Zalewo, within Iława County, Warmian-Masurian Voivodeship, in northern Poland.

Famous people 

Elisabeth Lemke (1849–1925), was a German historian, researcher of folklore, botany and prehistory of Upper Prussia, poet and writer.

References

Villages in Iława County